Just a Stranger is a 2019 Filipino erotic romantic drama film by Viva Films written and directed by Jason Paul Laxamana, starring Anne Curtis and Marco Gumabao. It was filmed in Lisbon, Portugal and it was released in the Philippines on August 21, 2019.

Plot 
A story of a woman and a man, half of her age being in love with each other despite the fact that they are both tied with someone else.

Cast

Controversy
Anne Curtis received backlash from netizens after posting the movie poster on Instagram last August 20, a day before the premiere of the film. The poster featured a daring image of Curtis and Gumabao. People began commenting how inappropriate it was for a married lady and that she should no longer accept such sexy roles. Her husband, Erwan Heussaff, came to the actress' defense, saying that  there is "no need to throw around words like disrespect or dictate what a person should or shouldn’t do after getting married.” He added that the "hilarious comments" are sexist. "If this was a married guy actor doing love scenes, no one would have any issue with it,” he said.

References

External links

Official Movie Soundtrack, Katrina Velarde, Magkaibang Mundo on YouTube

Philippine romantic drama films
Viva Films films